St Thomas More Catholic School, Willenhall is a voluntary aided comprehensive Catholic secondary school educating children aged 11–18 in the town of Willenhall, West Midlands, England.

Uniform
The school uniform is known to be simple with black blazers, black trousers, white shirt, black shoes and the school is also known to have a different colour tie for each year group which changes as the years go on.On 30 April 2012, it was announced that the P.E kit would be completely overhauled to a black, red and white coloured kit as their former P.E kit consisted of red shorts, blue jumpers and football socks with a white T-shirt.

Academic standards
After their inspection in October 2007, Ofsted rated the school as Satisfactory, point 3 on a four-point scale. They said "St Thomas More is an inclusive, popular school with a growing sixth form, which is well supported by parents and the local community. Its overall effectiveness is satisfactory .... Achievement is satisfactory and standards are average
across the school ... The school consistently delivers a high level of care and support for its students. The curriculum is developing well, and is good. Specialist status is managed well and has had a positive impact on much of the school's work."

Standards improved in 2008. The proportion of student gaining at least five GCSE grades at C or
above increased from 46% in 2007, to 59%. The most significant increase took place in science, where the percentage of students attaining grades A* to C increased from 33% to
61.5%. After numerous OFSTED inspections, since 2007, the school was inspected during February 2016 and secured a 'Good' rating and the school was praised for its significant improvements. The school was inspected again in November 2019 under a section 8 inspection and found that “St Thomas More Catholic School continues to be a good school” and the ethos and community environment of the school was praised highly as well as student conduct.

Change in Leadership
At the start of the academic year of 2012/2013 the former Headteacher (Mr Sean Flynn) announced that he would retire at the end of the Autumn Term (Just before the Christmas holidays) a replacement retired headteacher was appointed until
the permanent headteacher would take position this was Miss Angela Whelan. At the beginning of the Summer Term Mr Peter Mayland took the place of Mr Flynn and became the permanent Headteacher.
On 11 February 2015 Mr Peter Mayland resigned for personal reasons and Dr Sarah Hatfield took temporary charge, eventually becoming the permanent head teacher.
On 15 January 2018 it was announced that Dr Sarah Hatfield had resigned for personal reasons with effect from Easter 2018 and from that point Mrs Siobhan Bowen would act as Interim Headteacher. 
On 25 May 2018 it was announced that the Board of Governors of St Thomas More had successfully appointed Mrs Siobhan Bowen as the permanent Headteacher.

Extracurricular activities
Students earned a place in the Guinness Book of Records, in 1998, with the world's largest set of wind chimes.

Former annexe
The school gained an annexe in September 1973 when it took over the buildings of the former ''Francis Leveson Roman Catholic High School", on Bilston Lane, Willenhall. It continued to use this site until around 2003, after which the old Francis Leveson buildings (originally opened in 1961) were demolished and replaced by housing.

References

External links
 Official site
 St Thomas More Catholic School, Willenhall Department for Children, Schools and Families.

Secondary schools in Walsall
Catholic secondary schools in the Archdiocese of Birmingham
Willenhall
Voluntary aided schools in England